Ferdinand Ohene-Kena (March 28, 1936  October 4, 2019) was a professional Mining Engineer and a political figure in the Republic of Ghana.

Early life
Born in Kukurantumi, a town in the Eastern Region of Ghana, Mr. Ohene-Kena was the third of 7 children born to his parents.
Fred was a product of Ghana Secondary Technical School (GSTS) in Takoradi in the Western Region of Ghana. He received a scholarship to attend the Camborne School of Mines in the UK where he earned his first degree in Mining Engineering becoming one of the very first Ghanaians to do so. He later attended the Imperial College of London to earn his master's degree.

Career
He has served his country in a number of offices including what was his home territory as Eastern Regional Secretary during the PNDC era. Prior to that he served as the Under-Secretary for Lands & Natural Resources. He also served as Ghana's Ambassador to the Czech Republic before returning home to hold the position of Minister for Mines & Energy from 1997 until 1999 during the 2nd term of the Rawlings government. During the Kuffour administration, he was the Eastern Regional Chairman for the NDC political party. He later served on the Economic Advisory Council (EAC) and the Judicial Council of Ghana during the Mills administration and also served as the Chairman of the Minerals Commission of Ghana. On June 1, 2010, he was also appointed to the AngloGold Ashanti Board of Directors as a Non-Executive member. He held the position of Chairman of Ghana Bauxite Company Ltd during and after the PNDC era.

Awards and recognition
In 2009, during the 10th anniversary of Okyehene Osagyefuo Amoatia Ofori Panin II, he was conferred the Okyeman Kanea -the highest and most prestigious award by the Okyehene for his contributions in mining to Akyem Abuakwa.

In November 2017, Mr. Ferdinand Ohene-Kena was awarded the LIFETIME ACHIEVEMENT AWARD by the Ghana Chamber of Mines.

Death
On October 4, 2019, Fred peacefully died after a prolonged illness.

References

External links 
 Judicial.gov.gh
 Exeter
 GTV Tribute
 2017 GCOM Awards
 Former Minister of Mines & Energy dies at 83
 Okyehene marks 10th Anniversary with grand durbar

National Democratic Congress (Ghana) politicians
Ghana Secondary Technical School alumni
Ghanaian engineers
1936 births
2019 deaths